Saúl Victorino Molina  (born 14 March 1938) is a retired Salvadoran professional footballer. He coached in El Salvador and Costa Rica.

Club career
Molina started his career at Dragón while at the same time studying to become a teacher. He then spent too much time training with the national team that Dragón let him go and he joined Second Division side Águila in 1958. He took part in their promotion to the Primera División de Fútbol de El Salvador and formed a dangerous frontline partnership with players like Juan Francisco Barraza and Juan Antonio Merlos. He also won his and the club's first league title in 1959, scoring the only goal of the second leg of the Final. In 1965 he left Aguila for Luis Ángel Firpo after falling out with Argentinian coach Rodolfo Orlandini, but at Firpo he got injured soon and decided to retire from playing. After four years of retirement he returned to train with Dragón and then had a short stint at Aguila before a back injury cut short his career.

International career
Molina has represented El Salvador.

Managerial career
In 1981, he took up his first post as a coach when he took charge of 'his' Águila. He was appointed manager of  Santa Clara in March 2000. In 2002-2003 he coached second division side Atlético Chaparrastique almost to promotion. In April 2005 he was again appointed technical director of Águila.

References

1938 births
Living people
People from San Miguel Department (El Salvador)
Association football midfielders
Salvadoran footballers
El Salvador international footballers
C.D. Águila footballers
C.D. Luis Ángel Firpo footballers
Salvadoran football managers
C.D. Águila managers